Route 1 (Chinese: 一號幹線) is a major artery in Hong Kong that runs in a generally north-south direction, connecting Aberdeen with Sha Tin.

The route is heavily congested, notably on the Canal Road viaduct that links the Aberdeen Tunnel with the Cross-Harbour Tunnel in Causeway Bay. Route 1 continues to serve as the most direct route from the north shore of Hong Kong Island to the Southern District. The road travels across the harbour and runs through the middle of Kowloon and continues heading north into the New Territories.

History
Route 1 was established in January 2004 when the third generation of route numbers came into use, replacing the old system which had been used since 1974.

Route
The route begins in the south at Aberdeen Praya Road which continues as Wong Chuk Hang Road until reaching the Aberdeen Tunnel. The traffic runs on the Canal Road viaduct after exiting the tunnel in Happy Valley. The viaduct descends to the ground level passed the intersection at Gloucester Road for Route 4 to Tin Hau, North Point and Eastern Harbour Crossing.

Traffic then crosses the Cross-Harbour Tunnel into Kowloon and keeps heading north along Princess Margaret Road and Waterloo Road. The stretch of Waterloo Road between Hereford Road and Lancashire Road in Kowloon Tong is the only section of the route that is not controlled access. Traffic then climbs a steep incline to reach the Lion Rock Tunnel. At the end of the tunnel, the road skirts the border of Tai Wai. The route becomes an expressway in Sha Tin for the remaining 3 km. Traffic has an option to merge to Route 9 in Sha Tin or branch off onto Route 2 for Ma On Shan.

Exits and interchanges

Notes

References

 
Routes in Hong Kong